"You Are" is the title of a popular song from 1983 by the singer-songwriter Lionel Richie. "You Are" was written by Richie and his then-wife, Brenda Harvey Richie. It appears on his self-titled debut solo album, which came out in 1982. It resumes where he left off with D-flat major tunes with Commodores' "Sail On" and "Still", and his solo effort "Truly".

Released as the follow-up single to his number-one hit song "Truly", "You Are" reached the top five on three major Billboard music charts. On the Billboard Hot 100 pop chart, the song spent two weeks at number four in early 1983. It peaked at number two on the R&B chart (behind "Billie Jean" by Michael Jackson), and spent six weeks at number one on the adult contemporary chart. In the United Kingdom, the song reached number 43 on the British pop chart. 

Billboard said that it has a faster tempo than "Truly" and that it has "an inventive vocal arrangement, with deft harmonies and resonant bass rumbles."

"You Are" is a romantic song, although it has a more upbeat arrangement than many of Richie's slower ballads, including a horn section. Before achieving popularity for his own music, singer Richard Marx was a studio musician who can be heard singing backing vocals on "You Are" as well as other songs from Richie's debut album.

Richie re-worked the song as a duet with country singer Blake Shelton for Richie's 2012 Tuskegee album.

Charts

Weekly charts

Year-end charts

See also
List of number-one adult contemporary singles of 1983 (U.S.)

References

1982 songs
1983 singles
Lionel Richie songs
Motown singles
Songs written by Lionel Richie
Pop ballads
Song recordings produced by James Anthony Carmichael